Available Light may refer to:
 Available light, sources of light that not explicitly supplied by the photographer for the purpose of taking pictures
 Available Light (album), by Dave Dobbyn
 Available Light (EP), by James McCartney
 "Available Light", a song by Rush from the album Presto
 Available Light (1990 film), a British television film in the anthology series ScreenPlay